This is the list of episodes for Late Night with Seth Meyers in 2022.

2022

January

February

March

April

May

June

July

August

September

October

November

December
</onlyinclude>

References

External links
 
 Lineups at Interbridge 

Episodes
Lists of American non-fiction television series episodes
Lists of variety television series episodes